The Patterson was an electoral district for the Legislative Assembly in the Australian State of New South Wales from 1859 to 1880. It was named after the Paterson River, which was named after Colonel William Paterson. The river flows from Barrington Tops to the Hunter River at Morpeth. The district was created in 1858 replacing part of the 3 member district of Durham and comprised the midland and northern parts of the County of Durham. In 1880 it was replaced by Durham.

Members for Patterson

Election results

References

Former electoral districts of New South Wales
1859 establishments in Australia
Constituencies established in 1859
1880 disestablishments in Australia
Constituencies disestablished in 1880